Talvikuningas (2007)  is an album by the Finnish rock group CMX. The title is Finnish and translates to "The Winter King".

Talvikuningas is CMX's first concept album. Although the CD is divided into 12 tracks, they flow seamlessly into each other and the record is effectively one long song.

The first limited edition of 8 000 copies of Talvikuningas was released on September 5, 2007. This limited printing features special packaging and a 40-page booklet, which contains extensive artwork and the full libretto to the album. Digital downloads of Talvikuningas became available the same day. A regular CD version with ordinary jewel case packaging and reduced liner notes was released on 9 January 2008.

Story
The album tells the same story as A. W. Yrjänä's yet-unfinished book. It's an epic science fiction story taking place in the 25th century. The album's sections are pieces of the saga of the Winter King. Some previous CMX songs, like Mekaanisten lintujen Puisto (The park of mechanical birds) and Sivu paholaisen päiväkirjasta (A page of the Devil's diary) can be linked to the story.

Track listing
Music by A. W. Yrjänä except where noted. All lyrics by A. W. Yrjänä.
All arrangements by CMX and Rake.

 "Kaikkivaltias" – 10:26  ("The Almighty") 
 "Resurssikysymys" – 1:54 (Yrjänä/Halmkrona)  ("A Matter of Resources") 
 "Pretoriaanikyborgit" – 5:50 (Yrjänä/Halmkrona/Rasio)  ("Praetorian Cyborgs") 
 "Vallan haamut" – 5:31  ("Ghosts of Power") 
 "Tähtilaivan kapteeni" – 4:08  ("Captain of the Starship") 
 "Kosmologisen vakion laulu" – 3:52  ("Song of the Cosmological Constant") 
 "Parvatin tietäjä" – 4:26  ("The Sage of Parvati") 
 "Punainen komentaja" – 4:05  ("The Crimson Commander") 
 "Langennut valo" – 4:26  ("Fallen Light") 
 "Quanta" – 5:05 (Yrjänä/Rasio)
 "Rusalkai" – 3:41 (Yrjänä/Halmkrona)
 "Kaikkivaltiaan peili" – 8:31  ("Mirror of the Almighty") 

Bonus tracks on the 10th anniversary vinyl edition (2017):

 "Kuolemaantuomitut" - 4:06  ("Ones Condemned to Die") 
 "Mekaanisten lintujen puisto" - 7:45  ("Park of Mechanical Birds")

Personnel 
 A. W. Yrjänä – vocals, bass
 Janne Halmkrona – guitar
 Timo Rasio – guitar
 Tuomas Peippo – drums
 Rake (Rauli Eskolin) – keyboards, recording, production, mixing
 Pauli Saastamoinen – mastering
 Sami Saramäki – artwork and graphical design
 Gabi Hakanen – executive producer

See also 
 Talvikuningas in English

References 

CMX (band) albums
Science fiction concept albums
2007 albums